Zonotrichia is a genus of five extant American sparrows of the family Passerellidae. Four of the species are North American, but the  rufous-collared sparrow breeds in highlands from the extreme southeast of Mexico to Tierra del Fuego, and on Hispaniola.

Etymology 

Species 
The species in the genus Zonotrichia are:

These birds have brown backs streaked with black, and distinctive head markings. Their cup nests, built by the female, are of plant material lined with fine grasses and constructed on the ground, low in a tree or bush, or in a niche in a wall.

The female lays brown-blotched greenish-blue or greenish white eggs, which she incubates for 12–14 days. The male helps in feeding the chicks.

Zonotrichia sparrows feed on the ground on seeds, fallen grain, insects and spiders.

References 

 
Bird genera
American sparrows
Taxa named by William John Swainson